Matobo can refer to:
Matobo National Park in Zimbabwe
Matobo District, an administrative division of Zimbabwe
Matobo, Botswana, a village in Botswana

Fictional places:
the Republic of Matobo, a fictional country from the movie The Interpreter
Matobo, a fictional country from the Swedish comedy  ("Morgan Pålsson - world reporter").